Introducing Henry Santos or Introducing is the debut album by bachata singer Henry Santos. It is Santos's first album as a solo artist following the break-up of American bachata group Aventura, of which he was a backup singer and mostly the dancer of the group. This is also the first album in which he's the lead singer to every song. When he was with the group, he rarely was the lead vocalist. This album showcased his singing, especially with his first single, "Poquito A Poquito", in which peaked number 12 in the Billboard Tropical Airplay chart. Its second single, "Por Nada", peaked number 16 in the same chart.

Track listing

Charts

Weekly charts

Year-end charts

References

2011 debut albums
Henry Santos albums
Universal Music Latin Entertainment albums
Spanish-language albums